Love Don't Live Here is the fourth album released by American hardcore band Lionheart. The album was released on January 22, 2016 via LHHC Records in the US and Beatdown Hardwear in Europe and Asia. The album's name is a reference to the song of the same name by funk band Rose Royce, which is one of Rob Watson's favorite recordings.

The album was streamed four days prior to its release via Metal Hammer.

Reception 
Jens Kirsch, a writer for the German punk fanzine Ox compared the album with other albums from Hatebreed (The Concrete Confessional) and Born from Pain. He gave the album a positive review, writing:
 

Taylor Markarian of Revolver adds that:

Track listing

Personnel
Rob Watson – vocals
Walle Etzel – guitars
Nik Warner – guitars
Richard Mathews – bass
Jay Scott – drums

References 

2016 albums
Lionheart (Hardcore punk band) albums